Dreamy is an album by the indie pop band Beat Happening, released in 1991. The band recorded the tracks in a living room and in a professional recording studio.

Critical reception

The Chicago Tribune wrote: "It's a stripped-of-conventions, anti-pop stance that could sound just as calculated and empty as some elaborate pop productions, but Beat Happening imparts both quirky charm and a sense of immediacy to its material." The St. Petersburg Times deemed "Collide" "one of the eeriest songs to come along in a while... It's eerie in a playful, sickly pretty way."

Track listing
All tracks written by Beat Happening.

 "Me Untamed" – 3:46
 "Left Behind" – 2:53
 "Hot Chocolate Boy" – 2:21
 "I've Lost You" – 2:48
 "Cry for a Shadow" – 2:27
 "Collide" – 3:29
 "Nancy Sin" – 2:40
 "Fortune Cookie Prize" – 3:46
 "Revolution Come and Gone" – 4:16
 "Red Head Walking" – 2:07

References

Beat Happening albums
1991 albums
K Records albums
Sub Pop albums
Albums produced by Steve Fisk